Run Wolves Run is the sixth album by Sean Hayes. It was released on March 16, 2010.

Track listing
 "When We Fall In"
 "Open Up A Window"
 "Garden"
 "Powerful Stuff"
 "So Down"
 "Gunnin"
 "Shake Your Body"
 "Me And My Girl"
 "One Day The River"
 "Soul Shaker"
 "Stella Seed"

References

2010 albums
Sean Hayes (musician) albums